Kuppam is a Legislative Assembly constituency of Andhra Pradesh. Nara Chandrababu Naidu is the present MLA of the constituency, who won the 2019 Andhra Pradesh Legislative Assembly election from Telugu Desam Party.

Mandals

Members of Legislative Assembly

TRIVIA
KUPPAM assembly CONSTITENCY was represented by Nara Chandrababu Naidu from 1989 who was the first Chief minister of Bifurcated Andhra Pradesh & Longest served Chief minister of United Andhra Pradesh

Election results

Assembly Elections 2004

Assembly Elections 2009

Assembly Elections 2014

Assembly Elections 2019

See also 

 List of constituencies of Andhra Pradesh Legislative Assembly

References

Assembly constituencies of Andhra Pradesh